The Hit Factory: Pete Waterman's Greatest Hits is a compilation album featuring music produced by Pete Waterman. It was released by Universal Music in 2000 and reached #3 in the UK compilation Top 20 chart, achieving a Gold BPI award.

Unlike previous releases called The Hit Factory, this album concentrated on Waterman's productions outside his most successful Stock Aitken Waterman era and also included a couple of big hits that were exclusively licensed to his PWL Records label in which he had little production involvement.

The album features thirteen UK #1 hits and two further US #1's.

Track listing
Disc one  
"I Should Be So Lucky" - Kylie Minogue
"Never Gonna Give You Up" - Rick Astley
"Too Many Broken Hearts" - Jason Donovan
"Venus" - Bananarama
"Respectable" - Mel & Kim
"The Harder I Try" - Brother Beyond
"Say I'm Your Number One" - Princess
"Wouldn't It Be Good" - Nik Kershaw
"This Time I know It's For Real" - Donna Summer
"I Just Don't Have The Heart" - Cliff Richard
"I Want You Back" - Bananarama
"Pass the Dutchie" - Musical Youth
"Grease Megamix" - John Travolta & Olivia Newton-John
"Baker Street" - Undercover
"It's a Fine Day" - Opus III
"No Limit" - 2 Unlimited
"Pray" - Tina Cousins
"Nothing's Gonna Stop Me Now" - Samantha Fox
"Blame It on the Boogie" - Big Fun
"Thank ABBA for the Music" - Steps, Tina Cousins, Cleopatra, B*witched, Billie
"Roadblock" - Stock Aitken Waterman

Disc two  
"Tragedy" - Steps
"Better the Devil You Know" - Kylie Minogue
"You Spin Me Round (Like a Record)" - Dead or Alive
"Love in the First Degree" - Bananarama
"Together Forever" - Rick Astley
"Showin' Out (Get Fresh At The Weekend)" - Mel & Kim
"Whatever I do (Wherever I Go)" - Hazell Dean
"I Want You Back (PWL Remix '88)" - Jackson Five
"You'll Never Stop Me Loving You" - Sonia
"I Won't Let the Sun Go Down on Me" - Nik Kershaw
"If You Were with Me Now" - Kylie Minogue & Keith Washington
"Everyday (I Love You More)" - Jason Donovan
”One For Sorrow” - Steps
"Chiquitita" - Stephen Gately
"Sealed with a Kiss" - Jason Donovan
"Seasons in the Sun" - Westlife
"Especially for You" - Kylie Minogue & Jason Donovan

See also
List of songs that were written or produced by SAW (in chronological order, including US and UK chart positions)
The Hit Factory : The Best of Stock Aitken Waterman. (1987 UK compilation album released by Stylus Records).
The Hit Factory Volume 2. (1988 UK/Japan compilation album released by Fanfare Records and PWL Records.)
The Hit Factory Volume 3. (1989 compilation album released by Fanfare Records and PWL Records.)
A Ton Of Hits : The Very Best of Stock Aitken Waterman. (1990 compilation released by Chrysalis Records, trading as Dover Records.)
Stock Aitken Waterman Gold. (2005 compilation released by PWL Records in association with Sony BMG).
Pete Waterman Presents The Hit Factory. (2012 compilation issued by Sony Music).

2000 compilation albums
Albums produced by Stock Aitken Waterman